This is a list of volleyball players that played in the Philippine Super Liga (indoor and beach included).

Note: Names in BOLD are and have been team captains.

A
  Alnakran Abdill
  Gilbert Ablan
  Mike Abria
  Aileen Abuel
  Maria Carmina Denise Acevedo
  Leah Acepcion
  Hezzy Mae Acuna
  Erica Adachi
  Jasper Adorador
  Shaya Adorador
  Carmina Aganon
  Christine Agno
  Raphril Aguilar
  Adam Aidam
  Abdulwahab Al-Frazin
  Jacqueline Alarca
  Dante Alinsunurin
  Fernando Alboro
  Marlon Alcarde
  Carlo Almario
  Marjun Alingasa
  Paolo Alona
  Cendymie Amad
  Sarah Ammerman
  Charrisse Vernon Ancheta
  Amanda Anderson
  Arianna May Angustia
  Angel Mae Antipuesto
  Christopher Michael Antonio
  Angeli Araneta
  Christian Arbasto
  Arriane Mei Argarin
  Edward Arroyo
  Syvie Gay Artates
  Ken Boyd Aunda
  Tripoli Aurora
  Rachel Anne Austrero
  Arvin Avila

B
  Ivan Bacolod
  Edward Balbuena
  Mary Jean Balse
  Jophius Christian Banang
  Mary Ann Balmaceda
  Anjo Banaga
  Maruja Banaticla
  Mary Joy Baron
  Khristine Basco
  Nerissa Bautista
  Jade Becaldo
  Lloyd Arden Belgado
  Kirk Beliran
  Karla Bello
  Analyn Jhoy Benito
  Cindy Benitez
  Angela Benting
  Venus Bernal
  Mary Grace Berte
  Arlene Bernardo
  Alaina Bergsma
  Andro Billena
  Edmar Bonono
  Roberty Boto
  Coleen Laurice Bravo
  Leandro Brozula
  Jusabelle Brillo
  Emily Brown
  Faith Bulan

C
  Judy Ann Caballejo
  Jozza Cabalsa
  Carlo Joshua Cabatingan
  Shyrra Cabriana
  Joven Camaganakan
  Alegro Caprio
  Marrieta Carolino
  Michelle Carolino
  AJ Carson
  Joy Cases
  Rolando Casillan
  Michiko Castaneda
  Bonjomar Castel
  Fille Saint Merced Cainglet-Cayetano
  Fiola Ceballos
  Camille Cerveza
  Carol Cerveza
  Djanel Welch Cheng
  Jay Chua
  McDavid Chua
  Hans Christopher Chuacuco
  Dexter Clamor
  Lourdes Clemente
  Bernice Co
  Vhima Condada
  Michael Ian Conde
  Marleen Cortel
  R. Vie Costa
  Mae Crisostomo
  Charleen Abigail Cruz
  Dahlia Cruz
  Evan Cruz
  Jessica Curato

D
  Desiree Dadang
  Adam Daquer
  Rachel Anne Daquis
  Michelle Datuin
  Leuseth Dawis
  Samantha Dawson
  Jay De La Cruz
  Jessey Laine de Leon
  Rubie de Leon
  Pitrus de Ocampo
  Liza de Ramos
  Ana Ma. del Mundo
  Ronel del Mundo
  Michelle Grace del Rosario
  Karl Ian dela Calzada
  Rochet Dela Paz
  Aifrell Dela Pena
  Jennie delos Reyes
  Sandra delos Santos
  Dianna Diaz
  Cyd Demecillo
  Beauty Denila
  John Depante III
  Mariel Desengano
  Rysabelle Devanadera
  Norie Jane Diaz
  Glacy Ralph Diezmo
  Rhea Katrina Dimaculangan
  Jheck Dionela
  Gianes Dolar
  Jan Paul Doloiras
  Lindsay Dowd
  Marta Drpa
  Kim Kianna Dy

E
  Divine Eguia
  Sarah Jane Espelita
  Rica Jane Enclona
  Maria Mikaela Esperanza
  Angelo Espiritu
  Royce Estampa
  Wenneth Eulalio

F
  Dona Mae Factor
  Kim Fajardo
  Rossan Fajardo
  Alexis Faytaren
  Christian Ian Fernandez
  Jamenea Ferrer
  Kheeno Franco
  Reyson Fuentes

G
  Mikko Gako
  Ron Jay Galang
  Victonara Galang
  Fritz Joy Gallenero
  Emmanuel Gamat
  Carmela Garbin
  Kenneth Garces
  Jan Marie Grace Gayo
  Danika Gendrauli
  Fatima Bia General
  Angeline Marie Gervacio
  Hach Gilbuena
  Charlene Gillego
  Hansel Go
  Melissa Gohing
  Richard Gomez
  Jovelyn Gonzaga
  Jose Arianne Gonzales
  Sara Jane Gonzales
  Necelle Mae Gual
  Faye Janelle Guevara
  Nica Guliman
  Michele Gumabao
  Jill Gustillo
  Jem Gutierrez
  Melody Gutierrez

H
  Danna Henson
  Celine Hernandez
  April Ross Hingpit
  Gretchen Ho
  Sylvester Honrade
  Rhenze Hu
  Jerrico Hubalde

I
  Harby Ilano
  Cindy Imbo
  Rupia Inck Furtado
  Maria Theresa Iratay

J
  Kristy Jaeckel
  Russel Jalbuna
  Nino Jeruz
  Jeffrey Jimenez
  April Jose
  Mark Anthony Justiano

K
  Sontaya Keawbundit
  Sara Klisura
  Natalia Korovkova
  Wanida Kotruang
  Liis Kullerkann

L
  Michelle Laborte
  Rodolfo Labrador
  Alnasap Laja
  Jeffrey Lansangan
  Maribeth Lara
  Pam Lastimosa
  Louann Latigay
  Mark Lee
  Angelica Legacion
  Mariel Legaspi
  Xie Lei
  Zhanzhan Li
  Jhay-R Libay
  Marilyn Llagoso
  Carla Llaguno
  Jack Locquiao
  Gilbert Longavilla
  Carmela Lopez
  Jessie Lopez
  Maureen Loren
  John Carlo Lozada
  Dominico Ramon Lucinido
  Wanitchaya Luangtonglang
  Samuel Lubi
  Emmanuel Luces

M
  Edjet Mabbayad
  Lilet Mabbayad
  Hyrize Macabuhay
  John Angelo Macalma
  Dawn Macandili
  Marlon Macabulos
  Chris Macasaet
  May Jennifer Macatuno
  Florence May Madulid
  Gerald Magtoto
  Ara Mallare
  AJ Mallari
  Nino Mallari
  Jeffrey Malabanan
  Lutgarda Malaluan
  Armando Maleon
  Dindin Santiago-Manabat
  Rizza Jane Mandapat
  Mervic Mangui
  Kaylee Manns
  Jennifer Manzano
  Ronalyn Manzano
  Jhoana Maraguinot
  Abigail Maraño
  Justine Marchadetch
  Janine Marciano
  Jan Paolo Martinez
  Maricor Martinez
  Mary Grace Masangkay
  Sarah McClinton
  Hazel Mea
  Marijo Medalla
  Rence Melgar
  Kimberly Mendez
  Stephanie Mercado
  Katie Messing
  Mohammed Ali Hamzah Bin
  Zhang Mhinghua 
  Alexa Micek
  Howard Mojica
  Nestor Molate
  Frances Molina
  Decie Montero
  Jed Montero
  Sandy Montero
  Leoven Montierro
  Bren Montilerro
  Mecaila Irish May Morada
  Charmaine Moralde
  Lynda Morales
  Raffy Mosuela
  Neomi Mullenburg
  Yuki Murakoshi
  Ranya Musa

N
  Jannine Navarro
  Shiesa Nebrida
  Maricar Nepomuceno
  Savannah Noyes
  Angela Nunag

O
  Alexis Olgard
  Renz Ordoñez
  Patty Orendain
  Carl Laurence Ortega
  Maika Angela Ortiz
  Maureen Penetrante-Ouano

P
  Myla Pablo
  Jerra Mae Pacinio
  Joyce Palad
  Johnal Rey Pamintuan
  Jeanette Panaga
  Bangladesh Pantaleon
  May Ann Pantino
  Lizlee Ann Gata-Pantone
  Andre Joseph Pareja
  John Paul Pareja
  Richard Pascual
  Evangeline Pastor
  Maria Lourdes Patilano
  Iris Ortega-Patrona
  Janley Patrona
  Samuel Stephen Paquiz
  Henry Pecana
  Shermaine Penano
  Angelica Charisse Perez
  Ivy Jizel Perez
  Shiela Marie Pineda
  Warren Pirante
  Aiza Maizo-Pontillas
  Ma. Abigail Praca
  Alaynie Puylong

Q

R
  Giann Carlo Ramos
  Herschel Ramos
  Jason Ramos
  Southlyn Ramos
  Julius Evan Raymundo
  Ivy Remulla
  Jennylyn Reyes
  Kung Fu Reyes
  Mika Reyes
  Raid Benson Ricafort
  Dafna Robinos
  Reno Roque
  Joana Rosal
  Cristine Joy Rosario
  Suzanne Roces
  Patrick John Rojas

S
  Genie Sabas
  Jonah Sabete
  Relea Ferina Saet
  Mark Justin Sagad
  Shirley Salamangos
  Patcharee Sangmuang
  Ralph Joren Servillano
  Cristina Salak
  Edmar Sanchez
  Alyja Daphne Santiago
  April Sartin
  Michelle Segodine
  Wendy Anne Semana
  Janet Serafica
  Miyuu Shinohara
  Julius Sioson
  Rochelle Sison
  Roxanne Pimentel-So
  Maria Paulina Soriano
  Grethcel Soltones
  Maria Rosario Soriano
  Genina Sta. Ana
  Lindsay Marie Stalzer
  Timothy James Sto. Tomas
  Jamela Suyat
  Gyzelle Sy

T
  Maria Angeli Tabaquero
  Shaya Adorador
  Merichelle Tagudin
  Bea Tan
  Alexandra Denice Tan
  Jonathan Tan
  Toni Faye Tan
  Shinako Tanaka
  Misao Tanyama
  Jocemer Tapic
  Elena Tarasova
  Irina Tarasova
  Nicole Tiamzon
  Monique Tiangco
  Diane Ticar
  Tippy Tigpos
  Salvador Timbal Jr.
  Jeushl Wensh Tiu
  Bojana Todorovic
  Iris Tolenada
  Roland Tonquin
  Joey Torrijos
  John Paul Torres
  Patricia Siatan-Torres
  Honey Royse Tubino
  Carmela Tunay

U
  Eula Ugalde
  Ken Silverio Ucang
  Kerr Sherwyn Ucang
  Shyra Mae Umandal
  Ariel Usher

V

  Rosemarie Vargas
  Patrick Vecina
  Cindy Velasquez
  Zharmaine Velez
  Therese Maureen Veronas
  Jowie Albert Versoza
  Joel Villonson Jr.
  Cherry May Vivas
  Katarina Vukomanović

W
  Bonita Louise Francoise Wise
  Kayla Tiangco-Wiliams

X

Y
  Kim Ygay
  Iari Yongco
  Iumi Yongco
  Daniel Young
  Tim Young
  Giza Yumang
  Armie Yumul

Z
  Michael Zamora
  Luisa Mae Zapanta

Philippine Super Liga